Vellithira is a 2003 Indian Malayalam-language comedy-drama film written and directed by Bhadran. It stars Prithviraj Sukumaran and Navya Nair. The story is about a young man who is working hard to raise his sister. The music was composed by debutant Alphons Joseph. The songs were charbusters at that time, particularly the song "Pachamanga Pachamanga".

Plot

A teenage girl named Thatha is living with her blacksmith brother Vakkathi Vasu and his wife and children. Style Raj is a guy who moves from place to place with a movie projector and shows movie to public on the run for a living. He meets Thatha and falls in love. Vasu discovers that Raj is actually the murderer of the landlord who killed his father. In the end Raj is sent to jail.

Cast
Prithviraj Sukumaran as Style Raj / Raghuram 
Navya Nair as Thatha
Sudheesh as Mohammad 
Vinayakan
Jagathy Sreekumar as Erumathadam Jose 
Kalabhavan Mani as Vakkathi Vasu 
Oduvil Unnikrishnan as Peppatty Nair 
Cochin Haneefa as Panchayath President 
Ashokan as Gopu 
Kavya Madhavan as Pankajam ,Reghuram's brother 
Kalpana as Pushpam 
Indrans as Iyamkutty ,tea shop owner 
Machan Varghese as Nooli Thommy 
Salim Kumar as Surendran Vaduvanchery 
Innocent as Ittiyavira 
Bindu Panicker as Bhavani ,Vasu's wife
 Bindu Ramakrishnan as Raj's mother

Soundtrack 
The film's soundtrack contains 13 songs, all composed by Alphons Joseph. Lyrics were by Shibu Chakravarthy, Kaithapram.
Film marked the debut of Alphons as a film composer. The audio launch for this film's soundtrack was done by A. R. Rahman.

Awards
Kaveri Film Critics Award - Best Singer - Sujatha Mohan (also for 'Kasthooriman'')

References

External links

2000s Malayalam-language films
2003 romantic comedy-drama films
2003 films
Films directed by Bhadran
Indian romantic comedy-drama films
Films scored by Alphons Joseph